The 1960 United States Senate election in Colorado took place on November 8, 1960. Incumbent Republican Senator Gordon Allott was re-elected to a second term in office, defeating Democratic Lieutenant Governor Robert Lee Knous.

General election

Results

See also 
 1960 United States Senate elections

References 

1960
Colorado
United States Senate